Geodorum densiflorum,  commonly known as pink nodding orchid or 地宝兰 (di bao lan), is a plant in the orchid family and is native to areas from tropical Asia to eastern Australia and some Pacific Islands. It is a terrestrial orchid with broad, pleated, dark green to yellowish leaves and up to and twenty pale pink flowers with dark red veins on the labellum. It grows in wetter habitats including rainforest, woodlands, grasslands and swamps.

Description
The flowers do not usually open widely. Flowering occurs between December and February in Australia and between June and July in Asia.

Taxonomy and naming
This species was first formally described in 1792 by Jean-Baptiste Lamarck who gave it the name Limodorum densiflorum and published the description in the Encyclopédie Méthodique, Botanique. In 1919, Rudolf Schlechter changed the name to Geodorum densiflorum. The specific epithet (densiflorum) is derived from the Latin words densus meaning "thick", "close" or "compact" and flos meaning "flower".

Distribution
Geodorum densiflorum has been reported from India, Nepal, Bangladesh, Bhutan, Sri Lanka, Assam, Myanmar, Andaman & Nicobar Islands, Thailand, Vietnam, Ryukyu Islands, Ogasawara Islands, Guangdong, Guangxi, Guizhou, Hainan, Sichuan, Taiwan, Yunnan, Malaysia, Indonesia, Philippines, New Guinea, Australia, the Solomons, the Bismarcks, Fiji, Niue, New Caledonia, Samoa, Tonga, Vanuatu, and Micronesia. It grows in a range of mostly wet habitats including rainforests, forests and grassland.

In Australia, the species occurs in Western Australia, northern parts of the Northern Territory and from Cape York in Queensland to the Macleay River in New South Wales.

Conservation
Geodorum densiflorum is listed as "endangered" under the New South Wales Government Threatened Species Conservation Act 1995. The main threats to the species are habitat loss, weed invasion and trampling.

References

External links

 Geodorum densiflorum at India Biodiversity Portal
 http://www.orchidspecies.com/geoddensiflorum.htm

densiflorum
Orchids of Asia
Orchids of Australia
Orchids of India
Flora of Papuasia
Flora of the Northwestern Pacific
Flora of the Southwestern Pacific
Orchids of New Guinea
Plants described in 1792